William Woods Parsons (May 18, 1850 – September 28, 1925) is best known as being the former president of Indiana State Normal School, now known as Indiana State University.

Early life 
William Wood Parsons was born in Terre Haute, Indiana on May 18, 1850 to Dr. Thomas Parsons and Elizabeth (Ryman) Parsons. In 1857, he began his education at the Vigo County Seminary, which was located on the future site of the Indiana State Normal School. He continued school there until the family moved to Douglas County, Illinois in 1862. After Parsons graduated from Tuscola High School he returned to Terre Haute in 1870 where he became a member of the first class to enter the Indiana State Normal School. After graduating in 1872 he began his teaching career which took him to Tuscola, Illinois followed by Gosport and Indianapolis, Indiana. Parsons returned to Indiana State Normal as a teacher of grammar and composition in 1876.

Administrative years 
In 1883, Parsons was promoted to Vice-President of Indiana State Normal School. He became president of the institution on July 1, 1885. Parsons retired in September 1921. William Wood Parsons died in his home in Terre Haute on September 28, 1925.

References 

1850 births
1925 deaths
Indiana State University people
People from Terre Haute, Indiana
People from Tuscola, Illinois